Blade Runner 2049 is a 2017 American neo-noir science fiction film directed by Denis Villeneuve and written by Hampton Fancher and Michael Green. A sequel to the 1982 film Blade Runner, the film stars Ryan Gosling and Harrison Ford, with Ana de Armas, Sylvia Hoeks, Robin Wright, Mackenzie Davis, Carla Juri, Lennie James, Dave Bautista, and Jared Leto in supporting roles. Ford and Edward James Olmos reprise their roles from the original film. Set thirty years after the first film, Gosling plays K, a replicant blade runner who uncovers a secret that threatens to instigate a war between humans and replicants. The film was released on October 6, 2017, in the United States and has grossed $267 million worldwide.

Blade Runner 2049 received numerous awards and nominations. At the 90th Academy Awards, it was nominated for five awards, and won two: Best Cinematography and Best Visual Effects. At the 71st British Academy Film Awards, it received eight nominations, including Best Director, and won for Best Cinematography and Best Special Visual Effects. At the 23rd Critics' Choice Awards, it was nominated for seven awards, winning for Best Cinematography.

Accolades

Notes

References

External links 
 

Lists of accolades by film
Accolades
2017-related lists